A speech corpus (or spoken corpus) is a database of speech audio files and text transcriptions.
In speech technology, speech corpora are used, among other things, to create acoustic models (which can then be used with a speech recognition or speaker identification engine).  
In linguistics, spoken corpora are used to do research into phonetic, conversation analysis, dialectology and other fields.

A corpus is one such database.  Corpora is the plural of corpus (i.e. it is many such databases).

There are two types of Speech Corpora:

 Read Speech – which includes:
 Book excerpts
 Broadcast news
 Lists of words
 Sequences of numbers
 Spontaneous Speech – which includes:
 Dialogs – between two or more people (includes meetings; one such corpus is the KEC);
 Narratives – a person telling a story (one such corpus is the Buckeye Corpus);
 Map-tasks –  one person explains a route on a map to another;
 Appointment-tasks – two people try to find a common meeting time based on individual schedules.

A special kind of speech corpora are non-native speech databases that contain speech with foreign accent.

See also
Arabic Speech Corpus
Common Voice
EXMARaLDA
Lingua Libre, an online libre tool
List of children's speech corpora
Non-native speech database
Praat
Spoken English Corpus
The BABEL Speech Corpus
TIMIT
Transcriber
Transcription (linguistics)

References

 Edwards, Jane / Lampert, Martin (eds.) (1992): Talking Data – Transcription and Coding in Discourse Research. Hillsdale: Erlbaum.
 Leech, Geoffrey / Myers, Greg / Thomas, Jenny (eds.) (1995): Spoken English on Computer: Transcription, Markup and Application. Harlow: Longman.

External links
 Santa Barbara Corpus of Spoken American English
 Buckeye Corpus The Buckeye Corpus of Conversational Speech
 The KEC -- The Karl Eberhards Corpus of spontaneously spoken southern German in dialogues - audio and articulatory recordings
 Spoken Language Corpora at the Research Center on Multilingualism
 The Spoken Turkish Corpus at METU Ankara
 Spoken Corpus Klient with the Corp-Oral Corpus at ILTEC Lisbon
 VoxForge – open source speech corpora
 OLAC: Open Language Archives Community
 BAS Bavarian Archive for Speech Signals
 Simmortel Speech Recognition Corpus for Indian English and Hindi
 ELRA: the European Language Resources Association
 The PELCRA Conversational Corpus of Polish
 The Arabic Speech Corpus
 Corpus of Political Speeches : Free access to political speeches by American and Chinese politicians, developed by Hong Kong Baptist University Library

Corpora
Corpus linguistics
Speech recognition
Dialectology
Phonetics
Language documentation

de:Textkorpus